Kingston Paradise is a 2013 Jamaican feature-length film written and directed by Mary Wells and starring popular Jamaican entertainer Christopher 'Johnny' Daley.

Plot

Life on the streets of Kingston, Jamaica is about frantic survival for small-time hustler Rocksy—a taxi driver/part-time pimp—and Rosie, a prostitute, his roomie and business investment. They dream of something different, another life with a future. On the peeling walls of their tenement, Rosie prominently places a painting she owns that gives them both hope and something tangible to cling to. It's an exotic beach view of another more peaceful world, but they exist miles and worlds a part. So with his friend and cohort Malt, Rocksy eyes a fancy sports car nearby and together they devise a plot to steal it to sell for parts. The car belongs to a local Lebanese businessman, Faris and they figure the money could change their lives immediately, but of course it’s only temporary. Their plot is also risky and not well thought out.  Rosie is dead set against it and fed up. She dreams for the beach view, she wants out, out of being entangled and out of the life.  But she's bait and Rocksy cannot manage without her. When she finally leaves Rocksy becomes even more desperate and devastated. He does the unthinkable. In the chaos something changes within him, something rises and like the sun, it sets. In the context and contrasts of the Jamaican landscape its backstory is political, as the current embedded system doesn't allow for change...

Production and release
Kingston Paradise is the first feature by the well-noted Jamaican filmmaker Mary Wells who also produced the film. Kingston Paradise had a September 2013 premiere at Toronto's CaribbeanTales Film Festival.

The film won the Audience Award for Best Feature at the CaribbeanTales Festival in 2013; the Festival Programmer's Award for Narrative Feature at the Pan African Film Festival in 2014; and Best Diaspora Film at the 2014 Africa Movie Academy Awards. The production company is CaribbeanTalesFlix, along with sales representative California Pictures, took the title to 2014's Cannes Film Market.

See also
List of Jamaican films

References

External links
Official site
Facebook page

Jamaican drama films
2013 comedy-drama films
2013 directorial debut films
2013 films
Best Diaspora Feature Africa Movie Academy Award winners
Jamaican comedy films
2010s English-language films